Camp Jackson may refer to:
 Camp Jackson (Alabama), a camp near Scottsboro, Alabama
 Camp Jackson (California), a post located near Ione, California in Amador County during the American Civil War
 Initial name for Fort Jackson (South Carolina), a US Army base
 Camp Jackson Affair, a military encounter during the American Civil War which occurred outside of St. Louis in what has been called "Camp Jackson" 
 Camp Jackson (Korea), a US Army base south of Uijeongbu, South Korea
 A temporary camp in Goodale Park, Columbus, Ohio, used as a staging area for Union troops during the American Civil War

See also
 Fort Jackson (disambiguation)